Troy is a town in Obion County, Tennessee, United States. The population was 1,423 at the 2020 census. It is part of the Union City, TN–KY Micropolitan Statistical Area.

History
Troy was founded in 1825 as the original county seat of Obion County.  Frontiersman Davy Crockett was in attendance when the town was platted.  Troy remained the county seat until 1890, when it was moved to Union City following a contentious legal dispute.

Geography

Demographics

2020 census

As of the 2020 United States Census, there were 1,423 people, 684 households, and 464 families residing in the town.

2000 census
As of the census of 2000, there were 1,273 people, 533 households, and 367 families residing in the town. The racial makeup of the town was 98.35% White, 1.26% African American, 0.16% from other races, and 0.24% from two or more races. Hispanic or Latino of any race were 1.26% of the population.

There were 533 households, out of which 30.4% had children under the age of 18 living with them, 55.5% were married couples living together, 10.3% had a female householder with no husband present, and 31.1% were non-families. 28.0% of all households were made up of individuals, and 13.7% had someone living alone who was 65 years of age or older. The average household size was 2.39 and the average family size was 2.89.

In the town, the population was spread out, with 23.4% under the age of 18, 9.0% from 18 to 24, 28.8% from 25 to 44, 23.5% from 45 to 64, and 15.3% who were 65 years of age or older. The median age was 36 years. For every 100 females, there were 88.9 males. For every 100 females age 18 and over, there were 85.7 males.

The median income for a household in the town was $30,664, and the median income for a family was $38,500. Males had a median income of $28,594 versus $20,208 for females. The per capita income for the town was $15,255. About 12.5% of families and 14.6% of the population were below the poverty line, including 14.1% of those under age 18 and 25.4% of those age 65 or over.

Media
Radio Stations
 WENK-AM 1240 - "The Greatest Hits of All Time"
 WWGY 99.3 - "Today's Best Music with Ace & TJ in the Morning"

Notable people

Herbert L. Wilkerson, Major general in the Marine Corps and Veteran of World War II, Korea and Vietnam.

References

External links

 Official site

Towns in Obion County, Tennessee
Towns in Tennessee
Union City, Tennessee micropolitan area
1825 establishments in Tennessee